St. Fort railway station served the civil parish of Forgan, Fife, Scotland from 1878 to 1965 on the Tay Bridge Line and Newburgh and North Fife Railway.

History 
The station opened on 1 June 1878 by the North British Railway. To the west was the goods yard and to the east was the signal box. This was replaced in 1909 by the north junction box. The station closed on 6 September 1965.

References 

 

Disused railway stations in Fife
Railway stations in Great Britain opened in 1878
Railway stations in Great Britain closed in 1965
Beeching closures in Scotland
1878 establishments in Scotland
1965 disestablishments in Scotland